Galashiels Academy is the high school in Galashiels, Scotland, that serves the surrounding area including Stow. Refounded in 1938, the school's history goes back as far as 1696. The current building was built in 1964.

Notable former pupils

 John Collins, professional football player and manager
 John Davidson, campaigner for those affected by Tourette syndrome
 John Murray, cricketer, engineer and Royal Navy officer
 David Nichol, cricketer, brother of the below
 Robert Nichol, cricketer, brother of the above
 Chris Paterson (b. 1978), rugby union player
 The Rev Canon W. Gordon Reid, Rector of St. Clement's Church, Philadelphia
 Gregor Townsend, rugby player
Paul Johnston, British diplomat

References

External links
 Official website
 Galashiels Academy's page on Scottish Schools Online
 Inspection Reports

Educational institutions established in 1938
Secondary schools in the Scottish Borders
Galashiels
1938 establishments in Scotland